The 2011 FIBA Europe Under-18 Championship Division B was an international basketball  competition held in Bulgaria in 2011.

Final ranking

1.  Bulgaria

2.  Denmark

3.  Sweden

4.  Montenegro

5.  Estonia

6.  Netherlands

7.  Israel

8.  Hungary

9.  Belgium

10.  Slovakia

11.  Romania

12.  Portugal

13.  Switzerland

14.  England

15.  Georgia

16.  Norway

17.  Luxembourg

18.  Austria

Awards

External links
FIBA Archive

FIBA U18 European Championship Division B
2011–12 in European basketball
2011–12 in Bulgarian basketball
International basketball competitions hosted by Bulgaria